The Examined Life is a 1989 collection of philosophical meditations by the philosopher Robert Nozick. The book drew a number of critical reactions. The work is drawn partially as a response to Socrates assertion in Plato's "The Apology of Socrates" that the unexamined life is one not worth living

Summary

The book is an attempt to "tackle human nature, the personal, 'the holiness of everyday life' and its meaning." Nozick expresses his concerns with libertarianism and proposes some form of inheritance taxation. Within the first few pages of the book, Nozick alludes to being receptive to critics of his previous publication Anarchy, State, and Utopia by admitting that his libertarian concepts were "seriously inadequate".

Reception
Denis Donoghue praised The Examined Life in The Wilson Quarterly, but stated that it had some passages that were less strong than others. The journalist Jane O'Grady called the work "disappointingly schmaltzy" in The Guardian.

In The Oxford Companion to Philosophy (2005), the philosopher Anthony Quinton described The Examined Life as "unkindly treated".

Jim Holt, a columnist for The Literary Review leaves a few remarks about the "semantic slum", essentially deeming it "trickled down philosophy", saying that it is not worth following/reading.

Notes

1989 non-fiction books
American essay collections
Books by Robert Nozick
English-language books
Simon & Schuster books
Philosophy books